Kayo or KAYO may refer to:

People
 Kayo Hatta, American film director
 Kayo Shekoni, Swedish singer, dancer, and actress
, Japanese freestyle skier 
, Japanese former volleyball 
, Japanese Professor at Kyoto University
, Japanese judoka
, Japanese actress
, Japanese idol
, Japanese model
, Japanese translator and teacher
, Japanese international table tennis player
, Japanese athlete
, Japanese painter
, Japanese singer, and actress

Fictional characters
 Kayo Mullins, the title character's little brother in the comic strip Moon Mullins
 Kayo, a fictional character in the He-Man universe
 Kayo the Hutt, a Star Wars character
 Tin-Tin Kyrano, Thunderbirds character also known as "Kayo" in the 2015 series.
 Hinazuki Kayo, a main character in the manga and anime Boku Dake ga Inai Machi
 Police man in Lone Wolf McQuade
 Kayo, an accident-prone chameleon in Tabaluga

Other uses
 KAYO (FM), radio station licensed to Wasilla, Alaska
 KYYO (FM), radio station branded as 96.9 KAYO and licensed to McCleary, WA 
 Kayo (music), Korean term for pop music
 Kayo, member of the new wave band Polysics, whose name is taken from the Korean term
 Kayo or fry sauce, popular slang for the condiment created by mixing tomato ketchup and mayonnaise
 Kayo Chocolate Drink, bottled chocolate soft drink named for Kayo Mullins
 Kayo Sports, an Australian sports streaming service

See also
 
 
 KO (disambiguation)
 Kaio (disambiguation)
 Kajo (disambiguation)

Japanese unisex given names